Maisland, or Mais Land, was an area in Hudson County, New Jersey.

Location

The region of Maisland was located on the western slope of the Hudson Palisades.
Under the governorship of Philip Carteret, land in the region of Bergen was sold under the name the "New Mais Land" on May 12, 1668. The official proceeding allotted the area in the statement:

The township of Bergen was divided into several road districts by the freeholders of the Bergen, with the purpose to better regulate the local highway systems. What arose from the annual meeting was the creation of several districts, which remain today somewhat as distinct neighborhoods or cities; some of which were Bergen Woods, Bulls Ferry, Sekakes and Wehauk along with Maisland, and upon the freeholders' decision, an overseer for each district was appointed.

The area, which was one of the most populous sections of the township of Bergen, was referred to as Maisland for 135 years, when in the year 1803, Maisland became known as New Durham, which later on became part of North Bergen, New Jersey. Maisland today constitutes the same area as New Durham did, which is bounded roughly by the beginning of Union Turnpike, Bergen Turnpike, and the Tonnelle Avenue Station of the Hudson Bergen Light Rail. Within its vicinity during Maisland's frame of time was the Three Pigeons Tavern, which stood at the southern fringe of Maisland near the intersection of Tonnelle Avenue and Hackensack Plank Road, and the "Frenchman's Garden". This garden in Maisland, which later became Machpelah Cemetery, was the early source for Lombardy poplar Populus nigra, which spread across the United States.

The name Maisland comes from "Maize Land", where maize is the Native American word for corn.

A trucking company "Maisland Trucking Co." operated in nearby Kearny, New Jersey.

See also

English Neighborhood
New Barbadoes Neck
List of neighborhoods in North Bergen, New Jersey

References

Sources

Geography of Hudson County, New Jersey
Historic towns of Hudson County, New Jersey
North Bergen, New Jersey
Neighborhoods in Hudson County, New Jersey